Taj Wasan (born 23 October 1988) is a Pakistani first-class cricketer who played for Hyderabad cricket team.

References

External links
 

1988 births
Living people
Pakistani cricketers
Hyderabad (Pakistan) cricketers
People from Mirpur Khas District